Huadian may refer to the following entities in mainland China:

Huadian, Jilin (桦甸市), a city
China Huadian Corporation (华电集团), state-owned power generation enterprise
Huadian Power International (华电国际电力控股有限公司), subsidiary and listed company of China Huadian Corporation
Huadian Formation, palaeontological formation located in Jilin
Huadian, Ji'an, Jilin (花甸镇), a town
Huadian, a form of Traditional Chinese forehead decoration makeup.